Wenderson de Freitas Soares (born 4 January 1996), commonly known as Wenderson Tsunami, is a Brazilian footballer who currently plays as a left back for Bulgarian club Levski Sofia.

Honours

Cuiabá
Copa Verde: 2019

Levski Sofia
 Bulgarian Cup (1): 2021–22

Career statistics

Club

Notes

References

1996 births
Living people
Brazilian footballers
Association football defenders
Clube do Remo players
Rio Claro Futebol Clube players
Clube Atlético Tubarão players
Boa Esporte Clube players
Cuiabá Esporte Clube players
PFC Levski Sofia players
Campeonato Brasileiro Série D players
Campeonato Brasileiro Série C players
First Professional Football League (Bulgaria) players
Sportspeople from Belém